The 2015 K3 League was the ninth season of amateur K3 League. The top three clubs of each group qualified for the championship playoffs after the home and away season of two groups (16 matches per team) and the interleague play (9 matches per team). The first-placed team in the overall table directly qualified for the final and the other group winners advanced to the semi-final. The interleague games had to have penalty shoot-outs when they were finished as draws, and 0.5 points were awarded for a penalty shootout defeat.

Teams

Regular season

Group A

Group B

Championship playoffs

First round

Second round

Semi-final

Final

See also
 2015 in South Korean football
 2015 Korean FA Cup

References

External links

K3 League (2007–2019) seasons
2015 in South Korean football